Pain Halu Sara (also Romanized as Pā’īn Halū Sarā; also known as Halū Sarā-ye Pā’īn) is a village in Shabkhus Lat Rural District, Rankuh District, Amlash County, Gilan Province, Iran. At the 2006 census, its population was 701, in 177 families.

References 

Populated places in Amlash County